The speed limits in Georgia are regulated by Law of Road Safety, article 29.

Generic limits

Limits in urban areas 
There are several streets in Tbilisi, Batumi and Kutaisi where the speed limit is higher than generic limit (60 km/h).
For example:
 Embankments of Mtkvari river in Tbilisi have limit of 70 km/h
 George W. Bush street (airport route) in Tbilisi has limit of 80 km/h

Limits in rural areas 
Historically, maximum speed limit in Georgia was 90 km/h as there were no motorways in the country. With the change of government in 2004 and activation of country's economy, the construction of first motorway started. The motorway forms the one of the main transit routes of the country – S1/E60. Currently, the motorway part of the route spans from north exit of Tbilisi to Zemo Osiauri, a small village near Khashuri.

References 

Transport in Georgia (country)
Georgia